Kochetkovo is a rural locality (a khutor) in Kuybyshevskoye Rural Settlement, Sredneakhtubinsky District, Volgograd Oblast, Russia. The population was 185 as of 2010. There are 5 streets.

Geography 
Kochetkovo is located 10 km south of Srednyaya Akhtuba (the district's administrative centre) by road. Pervomaysky is the nearest rural locality.

References 

Rural localities in Sredneakhtubinsky District